Tremors 3: Back to Perfection is a 2001 direct-to-video  horror monster film directed by Brent Maddock, and is the third installment in the Tremors series featuring the subterranean worm-creatures dubbed "Graboids". It is a sequel to Tremors 2: Aftershocks. Michael Gross, Charlotte Stewart, Ariana Richards, Tony Genaro, and Robert Jayne reprise their roles from the first film. It is followed by Tremors 4: The Legend Begins.

Burt Gummer (Gross) has returned to Perfection, Nevada. Sure enough, Graboids attack again, only now they're split into graboids, shriekers and a new mutation known as ass-blasters, which are propelled into flight by combustible flatulence. Stalked by an albino sterile graboid known as El Blanco, it's up to Burt, Jack Sawyer (Shawn Christian) and other locals to save their town from destruction.

Plot
Adventurer Burt Gummer returns to his hometown of Perfection, Nevada, after a hunt for Shriekers in El Chaco, Argentina. Since the original Graboid attacks, the town's preventative equipment for tracking Graboid activities has fallen into disrepair due to the neglect of native residents Miguel, Nancy Sterngood, and her daughter Mindy. Walter Chang's market has been taken over by his niece Jodi, and the town has gained a new resident, Jack, who creates mock-attack tours for visiting tourists. One afternoon, during one of Jack's tours, his assistant Buford is eaten by an actual Graboid. Jack, Mindy, and Jack's customers manage to escape to warn the town, and Burt determines there are three Graboids in the area.

The residents begin to take action to kill the Graboids, but they are stopped by government agents Charlie Rusk and Frank Statler and a paleontologist, Dr. Andrew Merliss who claim the Graboids are an endangered species, preventing the humans from hunting them. Jack manages to reach an agreement with the agents that if they capture one live Graboid, Burt and the residents will be allowed to kill the remaining two. Burt grudgingly agrees, and he and Jack set out to trap a Graboid while the agents go after another of their own accord. Melvin Plugg, a fellow survivor from the original attacks, approaches Burt in the hopes of buying his land and developing it into a town. After he refuses, a Graboid attacks and swallows Burt whole. Jack lures the Graboid to Burt's home, having it fatally collide with the underground concrete barriers surrounding the building. He then uses a chainsaw to free Burt from its belly.

Burt, Jack, Jodi, and Miguel later find a badly wounded Merliss; he explains that he and the government agents were ambushed by Shriekers from the Graboid they were chasing, before dying. While tracking the Shriekers, an albino Graboid — later named El Blanco, meaning "The White One" in Spanish — traps them on rocks for the night. After drawing El Blanco away, they find that the Shriekers have molted their skin, becoming winged creatures capable of jet-propelled flight. Miguel is killed by the creature, which then crashes on a metal fence, killing itself. Burt realizes that chemicals in their stomachs react explosively, enabling their flight. Finding them able to carry Graboid eggs, they surmise that they evolved to spread them through flight. Jodi dubs the new species Ass-Blasters. Meanwhile, Nancy and Mindy are attacked by an Ass-Blaster in town and hide in a freezer while distracting it with food.

Using a mattress as cover from the Ass-Blasters' infrared vision, the group gets to Burt's house, but are forced to flee when an Ass-Blaster attempts to break in. To keep it from multiplying like its predecessors, Burt rigs his house and his stash of MREs to explode, killing it; however, it is only after that they learn from Mindy that Ass-Blasters do not multiply but fall asleep after eating, as has happened to the one that attacked her and Nancy. The group flees to a junkyard, where they build a potato gun from everyday objects to ignite the combustible materials in the Ass-Blasters' stomachs. After they kill four, Burt is attacked by El Blanco and pinned down. Realizing that Burt's ultrasonic watch is repeatedly drawing El Blanco to them, Jack takes it and sticks it to the final Ass-Blaster. El Blanco devours it, saving Burt and Jodi's lives in the process.

In the aftermath, Nancy manages to sell the captive Ass-Blaster, while Jack pursues a romantic relationship with Jodi, depressing Mindy who had a crush on him. Meanwhile, Melvin tries again to approach Burt about selling his land, but Burt informs him that since El Blanco is an endangered species and illegal to hunt, and formed a mutual unspoken friendship with Burt, the residents have decided to take precautions in order to live safely alongside it, thus turning Perfection into a federally protected Graboid reserve and barring Melvin from developing a town. Burt then leaves Melvin standing on a rock with El Blanco circling below.

Cast
 Michael Gross as Burt Gummer
 Shawn Christian as Jack Sawyer
 Susan Chuang as Jodi Chang
 Charlotte Stewart as Nancy Sterngood
 Ariana Richards as Mindy Sterngood
 Tony Genaro as Miguel
 Barry Livingston as Dr. Andrew Merliss
 John Pappas as Agent Charlie Rusk
 Robert Jayne as Melvin Plug
 Billy Rieck as Buford
 Tom Everett as Agent Frank Statler
 Mary Gross as a tourist mom

Production
The film was greenlit by Universal in August 2000.

In Tremors 3 some of the graboids were created using Computer generated imagery (CGI), which was the first time a Tremors film had used CGI to make a graboid. The graboids seen in the previous films were full-sized puppets and 1/4 scale miniatures. Some of the shriekers seen in Tremors 3 were also CGI, as well as some of the shriekers seen in the second film. However, due to software compatibility problems, the shrieker CGI from the second film could not be used again. Instead, new digital models were created by HimAnI productions using laser scans of existing physical models, which were used in the second film, created by Amalgamated Dynamics.

Release
Tremors 3: Back to Perfection was released on VHS and DVD on October 1, 2001.

Reception
Tremors 3: Back to Perfection holds an approval rating of 80% on Rotten Tomatoes based on 5 reviews. At the Video Premiere Awards show, in 2001, Michael Gross won the award for best actor for his work in Tremors 3. In an essay on direct-to-video horror sequels, Gavin Al-Asif for the Houston Chronicle said "[Tremors 3] is a jarring step down in quality from its predecessor," but called Gross's performance "absolutely brilliant" and "the one shining element in an otherwise mostly dull movie".

Awards

References

External links
Official Site

2001 films
2001 horror films
2000s science fiction comedy films
Tremors (franchise)
Direct-to-video horror films
2000s monster movies
Direct-to-video sequel films
Films set in Nevada
2000s comedy horror films
Direct-to-video comedy films
Direct-to-video science fiction films
Universal Pictures direct-to-video films
Films scored by Kevin Kiner
Films set in Argentina
2001 comedy films
2000s English-language films
2000s American films